The Moshir ad-Dowleh Mansion (Persian: عمارت مشیرالدوله) is a historical mansion in Tehran, Iran. It belonged to the Qajar era politician Hassan Pirnia. Declaration of constitution (Persian: فرمان مشروطیت [fa]) was written here by Mirza Nasrullah Khan, Hassan Pirnia's father, in 1906.

Parts of movies like Hezar Dastan and The Chess Game of the Wind were filmed in this mansion.

It was listed in the national heritage sites of Iran with the number 1899 on 2 August 1997.

Gallery

References 

National works of Iran
Buildings and structures in Tehran
Mansions in Iran
Buildings of the Qajar period
Tourist attractions in Tehran